Aaron Brewer (born July 5, 1990) is an American football long snapper for the Arizona Cardinals of the National Football League (NFL). Brewer signed with the Denver Broncos as an undrafted free agent in 2012. He played college football at San Diego State. He married Nicole Brewer on June 2, 2018.

College career
Brewer played long snapper at San Diego State University. In his junior year, he played in 13 games and recorded five tackles for the season. In his sophomore year, he played in all 12 games of the season as a long snapper. He also recorded four tackles for the entire year. In his freshman year, he played in 12 games along with one tackle.

Professional career

Denver Broncos
On May 3, 2012, Brewer signed with the Denver Broncos as an undrafted free agent.

Brewer was the long snapper for Matt Prater’s NFL record 64-yard field goal on December 8, 2013.

On February 7, 2016, Brewer was part of the Broncos team that won Super Bowl 50. In the game, the Broncos defeated the Carolina Panthers by a score of 24–10.

On March 8, 2016, the Broncos released Brewer along with tight end Owen Daniels and right guard Louis Vasquez.

Chicago Bears
On March 16, 2016, Brewer signed with the Chicago Bears on a one-year deal.
On September 5, 2016, Brewer was released by the Bears.

Arizona Cardinals
On September 28, 2016, Brewer was signed by the Arizona Cardinals.

On October 10, 2017, Brewer was placed on injured reserve after suffering a wrist injury. He was activated off injured reserve to the active roster on December 15, 2017.

On March 7, 2018, Brewer signed a four-year contract extension to remain with the Cardinals.

On November 11, 2021, Brewer was placed on injured reserve after suffering a broken arm in Week 9. He was activated on December 13.

On March 17, 2022, Brewer re-signed with the Cardinals on a one-year deal. He was placed on injured reserve on December 26, 2022.

References

External links
 San Diego State bio
 Denver Broncos bio

1990 births
Living people
Players of American football from California
Sportspeople from Orange, California
American football long snappers
San Diego State Aztecs football players
Denver Broncos players
Chicago Bears players
Arizona Cardinals players